Mark Stephen Kitching (born 4 September 1995) is an English professional footballer who plays as a left back or left midfielder for National League club Oldham Athletic. He has played in the English Football League for Rochdale and Stockport County.

Kitching started his career with Middlesbrough and had a loan spell with League Two club York City from 2015 to 2016. He joined Rochdale in 2017, initially on loan, before moving to Hartlepool United in 2018.

Career

Middlesbrough
Kitching was born in Guisborough, Cleveland. He progressed through the academy at Middlesbrough, the club he grew up supporting. His first involvement with the first team was as an unused substitute in a 1–0 home win over Derby County on 5 April 2014. Kitching signed a two-year professional contract with Middlesbrough in April 2014. He joined League Two club York City on a one-month youth loan on 26 November 2015, and made his debut two days later when starting in a 5–1 home defeat to Accrington Stanley. He lost his place in the team to Femi Ilesanmi, and returned to Middlesbrough in January 2016 without making any further appearances.

Rochdale
On 27 January 2017, Kitching joined League One club Rochdale on loan until the end of the 2016–17 season. He made his debut a day later as a 12th-minute substitute in a 4–0 home defeat by Huddersfield Town. He signed for Rochdale permanently on a one-and-a-half-year contract on 31 January 2017. He was released by Rochdale at the end of the 2017–18 season.

Hartlepool United
Kitching signed for National League club Hartlepool United on 3 July 2018 on a contract of undisclosed length.

Stockport County
Kitching signed for Stockport County on 17 July 2020 after turning down a new contract at Hartlepool United. He spent two full seasons at the club, where he won the National League title last season. On 20 October 2022, Kitching departed Stockport having had his contract terminated by mutual consent.

Oldham Athletic

He joined National League club Oldham Athletic on 31 October 2022.

Career statistics

Honours
Stockport County
National League: 2021–22

References

External links
Profile at the Hartlepool United F.C. website

1995 births
Living people
People from Guisborough
English footballers
Association football defenders
Middlesbrough F.C. players
York City F.C. players
Rochdale A.F.C. players
Hartlepool United F.C. players
Stockport County F.C. players
Oldham Athletic A.F.C. players
English Football League players
National League (English football) players